Bobby "Viper" Vanzie (born 11 January 1974) is a British former professional boxer who competed from 1994 to 2005. He held the British and Commonwealth lightweight titles between 1998 and 2001.

References

External links

Image - Bobby Vanzie

1974 births
English male boxers
Lightweight boxers
Light-welterweight boxers
Living people
Sportspeople from Bradford
Welterweight boxers